Thomas 'Clio' Rickman (1760–1834) was an English Quaker publisher of political pamphlets.

He was born into a Quaker family, the youngest son of John Rickman (1715–1789), a brewer and the freeholder of the Bear Inn at Cliffe, near (now in) Lewes, Sussex), and Elizabeth Rickman (née Peters). He published political pamphlets and broadsides, contributing to the poetry columns of the Black Dwarf and other periodicals.

Rickman married outside the Quaker faith, and after being disowned by the Society of Friends moved to London, where in 1783 he set up as a bookseller. He was a member of the Headstrong Club, and a friend of Thomas Paine, who lived with him when composing The Rights of Man in 1791 - they had first met during the time Paine was living in Lewes between 1768 and 1774. His Life of Thomas Paine was published in 1819.

See also
 Early American publishers and printers
 Robert Bell (publisher) Thomas Paine's publisher

References
 Thomas Rickman (1819) The Life of Thomas Paine via Internet Archive

External links
 Rickman’s publications
 Quakers in Lewes

1760 births
1834 deaths
18th-century English people
19th-century English people
English pamphleteers
English booksellers
People from Lewes